Stenoptilia nepetellae is a moth of the family Pterophoridae. It is found in Spain and France.

The larvae feed on lesser cat-mint (Nepeta nepetella) and Nepeta agrestis.

References 

nepetellae
Moths described in 1983
Plume moths of Europe